Kenwood is a historic 18th century property at 7437 Kenwood Lane in Gloucester, Virginia.  The centerpiece of Kenwood is a three-story house, built in several stages of wood framing and brick.  The oldest portion of the house is a Federal style wood frame section set on a brick foundation, with later Italianate brick and frame additions.  The property also includes a period 19th century smokehouse and cook's quarters, along with other 20th century  outbuildings. There is also remnants of a brick making facility at the far end of the property, near a tributary of Crany Creek.

The property was added to the National Register of Historic Places in 2015.

See also
National Register of Historic Places listings in Gloucester County, Virginia

References

Houses on the National Register of Historic Places in Virginia
Houses completed in 1800
Houses in Gloucester County, Virginia
National Register of Historic Places in Gloucester County, Virginia
1800 establishments in Virginia